Field Township may refer to:
 Field Township, Jefferson County, Illinois
 Field Township, Minnesota